In mathematics, if  is a group and  is a representation of it over the complex vector space , then the complex conjugate representation  is defined over the complex conjugate vector space  as follows:

 is also a representation, as one may check explicitly.

 is also a representation, as one may check explicitly.

If two real Lie algebras have the same complexification, and we have a complex representation of the complexified Lie algebra, their conjugate representations are still going to be different.

If  is a *-Lie algebra (a complex Lie algebra with a * operation which is compatible with the Lie bracket),

For a finite-dimensional unitary representation, the dual representation and the conjugate representation coincide. This also holds for pseudounitary representations.

See also

Dual representation

Notes

Representation theory of groups